Bananas in Pyjamas is an Australian children's television series that first aired on 20 July 1992 on ABC. It has since been syndicated in many countries and dubbed into other languages. In the United States, the "Pyjamas" in the title was modified to reflect the American spelling pajamas. It aired in syndication from 1995 to 1997 as a half-hour series, then became a 15-minute show paired with a short-lived 15-minute series The Crayon Box, under a 30-minute block produced by Sachs Family Entertainment titled Bananas in Pajamas & The Crayon Box. Additionally, the characters and a scene from the show were featured in the Kids for Character sequel titled Kids for Character: Choices Count. The pilot episode was Pink Mug.

The concept was inspired by the success of the song Bananas in Pyjamas, written by Carey Blyton in 1967, on Play School. This song, which had become a regular item on Play School, became the theme of the new series. The series was revamped in May 2011 as a CGI animated series created by Southern Star Entertainment.

Summary
The main characters are two anthropomorphic bananas named B1 and B2. Other characters include the three teddy bears Amy, Lulu and Morgan, and Rat in a Hat. The bananas, the teddies and Rat in a Hat all live in the same neighbourhood, a cul-de-sac called "Cuddles Avenue". The bananas live next to the beach and serve as beach patrol. The teddies live next to and look after the park. Rat in a Hat works and lives at the community store. The characters enjoy eating "munchy honeycakes" and "yellow jelly".

Production

Inspiration
The characters were inspired by a 1969 song written for children by British composer Carey Blyton (nephew of renowned children's author Enid Blyton). The jaunty song describes (an unspecified number of) bananas in pyjamas chasing teddy bears, with a slight twist at the end where a musical sting emphasises that the bananas like to "catch them unawares". The song was shown on the Australian version of Play School for many years accompanied by an animation depicting pairs of bananas in blue-and-white striped pyjamas. This led to a "banana" plush toy being created as part of the "toy cast", which formed the basis of the physical appearance of B1 and B2.

Filming
Creator, producer and showrunner Helena Harris devised the content of the ABC program at ABC Studios. Two of the bear characters, Amy and Morgan, are named after Helena Harris' children. The show was performed using human actors in elaborate costumes, in the style of the British Tweenies and Teletubbies. In the show's early days, the voices of the bananas were provided by the same actors as were inside the costume, but the original actors eventually gave up that aspect of the show and substitutes wore the hot, stuffy costumes. The show aired new episodes from its 1992 debut to its eventual run in syndication in 2002. The show aired approximately three hundred episodes as well as four specials. Its debut in the United States was in 1995. It made videos and other media from 1995 to 1999. A toy line, developed by TOMY, debuted in 1996.

Animated version

On 2 May 2011, a new version of Bananas in Pyjamas, produced by Southern Star Entertainment in full CGI, was premiered on ABC2 in Australia; it was shown in other countries soon after that date. It contains new songs, stories, and characters, including Topsy the cheeky kangaroo, Charlie the inventive monkey and Bernard the wise old dog. Development of the new series commenced in 2009, and production started in early 2010. The new series contains 104 12-minute episodes.

Characters

Main characters
B1 the Banana: Duncan Wass (1992), Ken Radley (1992–2001), Michael James (2001), and then Stephen Shanahan (2011–13), Richard McCourt (2011–13)
B2 the Banana: Nicholas Opolski (1992–2001), Benjamin Blaylock (2001), and then Daniel Wyllie, Dominic Wood (2011–13)
Amy the Teddy Bear: Sandie Lillingston (1992), Mary-Ann Henshaw (1992–2001), and then Isabella Dunwill (2011–13)
Lulu the Teddy Bear: Taylor Owynns (1992–2001), Monica Trapaga (Bananas in Pyjamas (album release)), Sandie Lillingston (Bumping and a-Jumping) and then Ines Vaz de Sousa (2011–13)
Morgan the Teddy Bear: Jeremy Scrivener (1992–2001), and then Troy Planet (AU Version), Sophie Aldred (UK Version) (2011–13)
Rat in a Hat the Rat: Shane McNamara (1992–2013)

Recurring characters
Bernard the Dog: Keith Buckley (2011–13)
Charlie the Monkey: Matthew Whittet (2011–13)
Kevin the Butterfly: Mal Heap (1992–2001)
Maggie the Magpie: Emma De Vries (1994–2001)
Mrs Rat the Rat: Georgina Symes (2011–13)
Tolstoy the Tortoise: Emma De Vries (1996–2001) and then John Leary (2011–13)
Tomasina the Turtle: David Collins (1999–2001) and then Meaghan Davies (2011–13)
Topsy the Kangaroo: Roslyn Oades (2011–13)

Farm animals
Farm Animals puppeteers: Mal Heap, Terry Ryan & Emma De Vries (2001)
Camembert the Cow: Taylor Sweeney and then Eliza Logan (2011–2013)
Pedro the Pig: Michael Phillips and then Anthony O'Donohue (2011–2013)
Gregory the Chicken: Matthew Hudak
Peck the Duck: Aaron Oberst-Horner
Dolly the Sheep: Maura McGinley and then Olivia Pigeot (2011–2013)
Flash the Fish: Jacob Matta

Episodes

Home video releases
The series has been released to home video, originally for VHS, later also for DVD.

 Birthday Special (1992)
 Show Business (1993)
 Hiccups (1993)
 Monster Bananas (1994)
 Big Parade (1994)
 Special Delivery (1994)
 Surf's Up (1995)
 Wish Fairies (1995)
 It's Music Time (1996)
 Singing Time (1997)
 Dress Ups (1997)
 Bumping and a-Jumping (1998)
 Holiday Time (1998)
 Fun Time (1999)
 Surprise Party (1999)
 It's Games Time (2000)
 Story Time (2000)
 Rock-A-Bye Bananas (2001)
 Summertime (2001)
 Dancing Daze (2002)
 Celebration (2002)
 Farm Adventure (2003)
 Beat Box (2003)

Discography
Bananas in Pyjamas (1993)
Live on Stage (1994)
Are You Thinking What I'm Thinking? Mix (1994)
It's Singing Time! (1996)
Bumping and a-Jumping (1997)
Cuddles Avenue Christmas (1997)
It's Show Time! (1998)
Get Up and Dance! (2000)
Banana Split Mix (2002)
The Fun Collection (2002)
Sing and Be Happy (2004)
Welcome to Cuddlestown (2011)
Playtime! (2012)
Best Of: Classic (2015)
50 Best Songs: 25 Years! (2017)

Charting singles

Cultural impact
The Bananas in Pyjamas were featured among other famous Australians during the parade of the 2000 Summer Olympics closing ceremony.

In 2017, the Royal Australian Mint produced a commemorative set containing five-cent and 20-cent coins to mark the 25th anniversary of Bananas in Pyjamas. The five-cent coin, which is coloured for the first time, depicts Rat-in-a-Hat, while the twenty-cent coin depicts B1 and B2.

Awards and nominations

APRA Music Awards

ARIA Music Awards

British Academy Children's Awards

Logie Awards

See also

 List of longest-running Australian television series

References

External links
Bananas in Pyjamas – Original website
Bananas in Pyjamas – ABC TV

1992 Australian television series debuts
2001 Australian television series endings
2010s Australian animated television series
2011 Australian television series debuts
2013 Australian television series endings
1990s preschool education television series
2000s preschool education television series
2010s preschool education television series
Animated preschool education television series
Australian Broadcasting Corporation original programming
Australian children's animated television series
Australian children's television series
Australian children's musical groups
Australian computer-animated television series
Australian preschool education television series
Australian television shows featuring puppetry
Bananas in popular culture
English-language television shows
Fruit and vegetable characters
Television series by Endemol Australia
Television series with live action and animation
Animated television series about bears
Animated television series about mice and rats
Musical groups established in 1992